Dora M Emdin (4 August 1912 – 1945) was a female English international table tennis player.

Table tennis career
She won a bronze medal at the 1934 World Table Tennis Championships in the women's singles.

She won another bronze at the 1938 World Table Tennis Championships in the women's doubles with Margaret Osborne and a silver medal in the women's team. She also won five English Open titles.

Personal life
Her older sister Doris Lucy Emdin was also a notable table tennis international.

She married Jack Zillwood in 1940 and died, aged 32, after a short illness in 1945.

See also
 List of England players at the World Team Table Tennis Championships
 List of World Table Tennis Championships medalists

References

English female table tennis players
1912 births
1945 deaths
World Table Tennis Championships medalists